Student soldiers were students that fought for South Korea during the Korean War from June 1950 to March 1951. Students volunteered or were conscripted into the Republic of Korea Army as emergency troops to fight against North Korea's invasion of South Korea. The invasion triggered the conflict and almost overran the country. The student soldiers were demobilized when South Korean and United Nations forces secured the 38th parallel nine months later, and they returned to their education.

Definition 
The soldiers were typically high school students. In its narrowest sense, it often refers only to students who were forced to join them during the Japanese occupation period and Korean War. Generally, students who were studying found themselves exempted from the draft but in emergency situations, students were drafted into the army and engaged in the battle.

Korean War 

The organization of 'The army of  Student Soldiers for emergencies(비상학도대)' by 200 student officers of the "Association of the students who protect the country(학도호국단)" from all around Seoul who gathered in Suwon was the first time  student soldiers were conscripted . Some of them were wearing rifles and ammunition with their uniforms as they were, and they entered the South Korean army unit, which was guarding the Han river from June 29, 1950, to participate in the battle. However, the Ministry of National Defense has made most of the student soldiers responsible for the rear-end missions, including refugee relief, bulletin reports and street propaganda. Many students were not satisfied with their mission in the rear, but they supported individual enlistment, and the rest asked students to authorize the Ministry of National Defense to form a battle unit with the school only. However, the Ministry of National Defense's high - ranking officials insisted on pursuing the guidance of the Ministry of Defense while retaining the participation of the academics who will bear the future of the nation. The evacuation academics who came to Daejeon on July 14 and the local academics organized themselves again.

The students individually supported the local enlistment and served as soldiers of the Armed Forces. A number of female students were also appointed as nurses. The student soldiers went down to Daegu and were once again organized into 10 divisions of the armed forces and their subordinate units. The student soldiers made great achievements in the Nakdong River Defense Line, which was considered as the last fortress. About 700 of them were transferred to UN troops in Busan in mid-July. After graduating, they went to Japan and went on a regular operation in Incheon Landing Operation on September 15. In addition, the 22nd and 26th Regions of the Third Division of the Korea Army, and the 15th Regiment of the First Division of the Korea army filled the majority of the recruits with the student soldier from the middle of July. At the beginning of August, the 25th generation newly formed army in Daegu also filled most of the troops with student soldier.

In early August, about 1,500 students from the army headquarters of the Army headquarters in Daegu soon joined the Korean Armed Forces in Milyang. They penetrated the enemy's rear area and deployed guerrilla warfare. Among them, the 1st Battalion was put into landing operation in Yeongdeok District, Gyeongsangbuk-do, and 100 victims were killed. The 2nd, 3rd and 5th battalions were put into Taebaek mountain range from early October and cleared the enemy who flew away. After that, it was put into Honam district again from December, and the residue was swept away. The school graduates also accomplished a great deal by carrying out pre-emptive activities for the residents in the vulnerable area south of the 38th and 38th in the restoration area, where frequent visits to spies were frequent.

As the army crossed the 38th parallel, the academics of the restoration area also supported the operation of the armed forces through various organizations themselves. They were grouped together with a 1.4 retreat and continued in the name of the school militia, and many of them enlisted as regular army troops, numbering about 4,000. On the other hand, approximately 700 Korean-Japanese students from Japan were also raised to rescue their homeland. They joined the United Nations forces and participated in the battle, with 59 killed and 95 missing

In March 1951, when the ROK forces and UN troops restrained the tactics of the Chinese army and restored the balance and stability of the front lines, the people who came down to find refugees also began to return to their hometowns to regain their jobs. President Lee Seung-man announced that the young students who will bear the future of the nation should return to the academy urgently to continue their studies. The Ministry of Education issued the following instructions to the students scattered across the country.

Blessing instruction 
Students received good luck blessings:

① All student soldiers will return to their original school.

② School authorities will accept unconditional restitution if the military service of the school is cancelled due to military service

③ The military and other schools will be returning from military service

④ The students who missed the grade promotion of military uniforms will accept grade promotion according to their wishes.

Monuments and Memorials hall

Student Soldier Korean War monument 
There is a monument in front of Pohang Girls' High School in Haksan-dong, Buk-gu, Pohang, Gyeongsangbuk-do where 71 students were ambushed wearing their uniforms at 4 am on 11 August 1950. They fought for an extended period of time with the North Korean Army, backed up by five armoured vehicles. In all 48 died. In order to honour their noble sacrifice, Pohang City built the memorial in 1977 and held a memorial service.

Student Soldier Memorial Hall 

On 16, September 16, 2002, a hall was opened in Yongheung Park, No. 103, Yongheung, Buk-gu, Pohang, GyeongSangBuk-do, in honour of the students who participated in the battle of Pohang District in GyeongsangBuk-do Province during the Korean War. In the exhibition room, there are about 200 artifacts such as diaries, photographs, and weapons used by the municipal police officers at the time, worn clothes. In addition, war-related documentaries are shown in the audiovisual room.

Unknown Student Soldier Tower 
This tower is located at Seoul National Cemetery. In this tower, the remains of 48 unknown soldiers, who were killed in Pohang district during the Korean War were buried in a hemispherical grave. As the war broke out in the wake of the Korean War, the country's fate was at risk, and about 50,000 students were dressed in school uniforms and volunteered to fight in the battlefields. In many cases, the bodies of those who were killed could not be found.

The 48 people here were those who were killed during the battle of Pohang against the North Korean army. At the time, these people were buried near Pohang Girls' High School. Later, the Cabinet decided to put them in the army cemetery. The Korea Student Soldier Fellowship moved them to the 5th Cemetery of the Korea Army Cemetery and then in April 1968 April, to the School Academic Unknown Soldier tower.

The tower was erected on October 30, 1954 as the "Unknown Soldier", but was renamed as "Nameless Tower" by laying down a representative unnamed warrior on January 16, 1956. In April 1968, the body of a representative unnamed warrior was converted into a crypt and the tower was relocated to its present location. Forty-eight unnamed volunteers were stationed at the back of the tower, and the altar was moved to this place, marked as the "Grave of the Student Soldier." The name of the tower was also changed to "Unknown Student Soldier Tower".

The tower is made up of three arched doors. There is an Unknown Student Soldier tower in the middle of a large door. In the center of the back of the tower is the hemispherical grave made of square granite stone. The stone of this tower is pentagonal, its surface is of sulfur grade, and the arch itself of granite. The height of the tower is 3.6m, the width is 8m, the height of the central gate is 5.5m, the height of the left and right door is 3 m, and the floor area of granite is 165 m2.

Awards and compensation 
Since 1968, the Government of South Korea has awarded the students national merits. In January 1967, 317 people who could prove they met the criteria were handed the award. In 1997, the government handed it out to a further 45 people who had failed to receive it before.

In the media 
On June 16, 2010, the movie 71: Into the Fire was released, which depicted the defense of P'ohang girls' middle school by 71 student soldiers during the Korean War, mainly in August 1950.
On 2019, The Battle of Jangsari.

References 

Korea
South Korean military personnel of the Korean War